Castello di San Salvatore may refer to:
Castello San Salvatore, a castle in Susegana, Veneto
Forte del Santissimo Salvatore, a fort in Messina, Sicily